Art Plus Magazine (stylized as Art+ Magazine, formerly known as Contemporary Art Philippines) is a magazine published bi-monthly from Mandaluyong, Philippines. The magazine includes reviews of visual arts exhibitions in and around the Philippines as well as features on Philippine art, book, film, and theater reviews, a visual arts calendar, an auction update section, an exhibitions calendar, and a gallery directory. It also features the White Wall section, where guest contributors and curators select featured artwork around a theme. It is the only magazine in the Philippines to specialize in Philippine visual art.

The company's multimedia platform expanded in recent years with the launch of Art+ Magazine's e-commerce arm, Art+ Collectibles, in 2021. The online shop extended into an inclusive platform for up-and-coming local artists as it opened its online exhibition space through Art+ Discoveries. Recently, Art+  launched the first Modern and Contemporary Art Festival (alternatively known as MoCAF), featuring the fast-developing Philippine art scene, showcasing revered modern and contemporary masters and rising artists.

History 
Art+ Magazine was established in 2008 formerly as Contemporary Art Philippines. It is the longest-running visual arts magazine in the Philippines. The magazine is published once every two months (bi-monthly), or six times a year.

Notable Contributors 
 Cid Reyes
 Alice Guillermo
 Patrick Flores
 Lisa Ito
 Carlomar Daoana
 Patty Tumang
 Laurel Fantauzzo
 Siddharta Perez

Editorial Team 
 Managing EditorJewel Chuaunsu
 Art DirectorMark Vivar
 PublisherDagny Ayaay
 FounderJack Teotico

Awards 
 Philippine Social Media WeekSocial Media Excellence Award Arts & Lifestyle Category (2019)
 Printing Industries Association of the PhilippinesPrint Excellence 2018 Award - Magazine Category (2018)

Published Issues

References

External links 
 Art+ Magazine
 Art+ Collectibles
 Modern and Contemporary Art Festival (MoCAF)

2008 establishments in the Philippines
Visual arts magazines
Bi-monthly magazines
Magazines established in 2008
Magazines published in the Philippines